The Catoosa County Courthouse, at 7694 Nashville St. in Ringgold, Georgia, was built in 1939.  It was listed on the National Register of Historic Places in 2006.

It was designed by architects Crutchfield and Law in Colonial Revival style.

It is a two-story, brick building with a pediment and cupola and a hipped roof.  It has a central block with three bays and flanking symmetrical wings, each with three bays.

References

County courthouses in Georgia (U.S. state)
National Register of Historic Places in Catoosa County, Georgia
Colonial Revival architecture in Georgia (U.S. state)
Government buildings completed in 1939
1939 establishments in Georgia (U.S. state)